Yuri Mochanov (8 November 1934 – 20 October 2020) was a Russian archaeologist.

Biography
Mochanov graduated from Leningrad State University in 1957 with a degree in history. He served as Deputy Director for Science at the Institute for Humanitarian Research. He discovered Upper Paleolithic Dyuktai Culture, stone tools in Diring Yuriaj in Siberia, and 1000 different archaeological sites. In his book In Siberia, author Colin Thubron recounted his meetings with Mochanov.

References

1934 births
2020 deaths
Russian archaeologists
Saint Petersburg State University alumni